The Tamandaré class are a new class of future general purpose frigates for the Brazilian Navy, based on the MEKO family of ships. The project is being developed by the Ministry of Defence and the Águas Azuis consortium, composed of ThyssenKrupp Marine Systems (TKMS) and Embraer Defense & Security. The construction of the four planned frigates started in 2022 and are scheduled to be delivered between 2024 and 2028.

Program history
The program called "Construction of the Naval Power Nucleus" - plan to modernize the surface fleet of the Brazilian Navy - was created in 2017 with the main purpose of replacing the  frigates in operation since 1975 and the Type 22s acquired second-hand from the UK in the 1990s.

Several companies from seventeen countries entered in the competition opened by the Ministry of Defence, offering different types of projects and offset packages. On 16 May 2017, the list of all participating companies was released.

On 15 October 2018, after more than a year of studies by the Directorate of Program Management of the Navy (DGePM) and the Naval Projects Management Company (EMGEPRON), the short-list of the finalist projects was released, the selected projects were:
 Águas Azuis consortium, composed of TKMS, Embraer Defense and Security, Atech and the Oceana shipyard, with a proposed MEKO A-100-class corvette, extended and rearmed; 
 Damen-Saab Tamandaré consortium composed of Damen Schelde, Saab AB, Consub Defense and Technology and the Wilson Sons shipyard, with the Sigma-class corvette;
 FLV consortium with Fincantieri, Leonardo and Vard Promar shipyard, proposing a version of EMGEPRON's indigenous project;
 Villegagnon consortium with Naval Group, Mectron and Enseada Indústria Naval shipyard, with Gowind-class corvette.

On 28 March 2019, the winning project was presented, the Águas Azuis consortium led by TKMS with a project of the 3,500-ton MEKO A-100-class corvette. In April of the same year, the class was reassigned from corvette to frigate.

The contract of € 2 billion, was signed between the Brazilian government and the winning consortium on 6 March 2020, with the start of construction of the first of the four frigates planned for 2021. The Brazilian Navy plans to order two more class frigates, extending the total to six boats.

In January 2021, TKMS confirmed the acquisition of the Oceana shipyard in Itajaí, becoming the company's first shipyard in Latin America, with the objective of building the new Brazilian frigates, and future sales to other navies in the region.

Navy' specifications
The specifications for the new class of frigates were defined by the Brazilian Navy through the Directorate of Program Management of the Navy (DGePM) and the Naval Projects Management Company (EMGEPRON), in addition to replacing the oldest ships in the fleet, aims to protect of the so-called Blue Amazon (Portuguese: A Amazônia Azul), a resource-rich area covering about 4.5 million square kilometers off the Brazilian coast, conduct search and rescue operations and meet international commitments, among other tasks.

The plan required projects with the following armaments and specifications: unit price between € 400–500 million, OTO Melara 76 mm main gun, minimum eight VLS Sea Ceptor CAMM missile cells, a Rheinmetall Sea Snake 30 mm machine gun, two .50 machine guns, two triple Mark 46 anti-submarine torpedo launchers and two twin anti-ship missile launchers for the MANSUP missile. In addition to a propulsion system for diesel engines and a hangar capable of operating a SH-60 Seahawk, Super Lynx Mk.21B or Eurocopter EC725.

The winning consortium will have to build the four ships in Brazil, in addition to transferring 100% of the project's technology (ToT) to the Brazilian Navy.

ThyssenKrupp project
The Águas Azuis consortium, led by ThyssenKrupp Marine Systems presented its frigate proposal, based on the original design of the MEKO A-100 corvette, the project had an extended tonnage from 2,000 to 3,500 tons, length increase, several new state-of-the-art systems such as Hensoldt TRS-4D AESA radar, weapons and fire control, thus allowing the ship to gain muscle to carry out oceanic crossings in the stormy South Atlantic. The TKMS also presented offsets to the Brazilian Navy, such as the remotorization of the Tupi-class submarines built by the same company in the 1980s and 1990s.

Atech, an Embraer Group company, will be the supplier of the CMS (Combat Management System) and IPMS (Integrated Platform Management System). Other aspects of the project that led to the winning bid are the similarities with the MEKO A-200 frigate class and its modular construction system, allowing versatility in future updates.

The Brazilian Navy also plans to build 7,000-ton destroyers after the delivery of the new frigates, and TKMS presented to the Navy its most modern 7,200-ton MEKO A-400 air defense destroyer, an updated version of the German F-125-class frigates. The similarities between the projects and the high rate of commonality between requirements were also crucial for the consortium's victory.

Units
There are the status of the four units:

See also

 , an Australian-New Zealander class of comparable frigates
 List of frigates

References

External links 
 Águas Azuis consortium website 
 TKMS Brazil website 
 Tamandaré project website

 
Frigate classes
Proposed ships
Ships built in Brazil